Shailesh Kumar (born 25 December 1963) is an Indian politician belonging to the Janata Dal (United) who currently serves as the Rural Work Department Minister of Bihar since 2015. He was elected as a member of the Bihar Legislative Assembly from Jamalpur constituency from 2005 to 2015.

Early life 

Shailesh Kumar was born on 25 December 1963, Bariarpur, Munger district, Bihar. His father, Late Suresh Kumar Singh was also Member of Legislative Assembly from Jamalpur constituency(Bharatiya Jana Sangh Party) for two terms in 1975 and 1977. Kumar completed his Primary education in Philip High School Bariarpur. He graduated from Sahibganj College Jharkhand and pursued his post graduation (Master of Art) from R.D.&D.J. College, Munger in 1984.

After completing his degree he became History Lecturer in Asarganj College from 1989 to 1993. He started involving in social activities from 1985. He worked in many NGOs. He was also member of Red Cross society which is a voluntary humanitarian organization to protect human life and health based in India. He married Nootan Sinha on 2 July 1993. She is from Madhusudanpur, Muzaffarpur District. They have a son and 2 daughters.

Political career 

In 1995, He joined Samta party under the leadership of George Fernandes and Nitish Kumar. He Contested election but lost from few margin. In 2000 he again Contested election from Independent party and came second position. Under the leadership of Nitish kumar when Janta Dal United party came to power in 2005, he was elected as Member of Assembly from Jamalpur Constituency. In 2010 again he won election from the same constituency. In 2015, he became the Minister of Rural Work Department till date.

Positions held

References

 https://nocorruption.in/politician/shailesh-kumar/
 https://www.livehindustan.com/bihar/munger/story-jamalpur-mla-shailesh-becomes-second-time-minister-1209347.html
 Jamalpur, Munger (Vidhan Sabha constituency)
 Jamalpur, Munger (Vidhan Sabha constituency)
 https://rwdbihar.gov.in/
 https://www.livehindustan.com/bihar/story-minister-of-rural-works-department-shailesh-kumar-claims-by-the-year-2021-all-rural-roads-of-bihar-will-be-built-2852288.html

Members of the Bihar Legislative Assembly
Living people
1963 births
Janata Dal (United) politicians
Bihari politicians
Bihar Minister
People from jamalpur
People from Munger
People from Nalanda